Ipsos Group S.A. (an acronym of ) is a multinational market research and consulting firm with headquarters in Paris, France. The company was founded in 1975 by Didier Truchot, Chairman of the company, and has been publicly traded on the Paris Stock Exchange since 1 July 1999.

Since 1990, the Group has created or acquired numerous companies. In October 2011, Ipsos acquired Synovate, resulting in a Ipsos organization that ranks as the world’s third largest research agency. As of 2014, Ipsos has offices in 88 countries, employing 16,530 people.

History

First years in France
Ipsos was founded in 1975 by Didier Truchot, who had experience working in the IFOP institute.

Truchot centered in offering services to the advertising and media companies and developed methods to measure the success of their campaigns, something new in France. The first of these methods was the Baromètre d'Affichage (BAF) in 1977, an instrument to analyse the effectiveness of billboard advertisements. It was followed by an instrument specific for media and, in 1979, the France des Cadres Actifs (FCA), which was used to determine reading habits of French executives.

Despite the success, the company's profitability remained at modest levels until the arrival of Jean-Marc Lech as co-chairman. From then on, it started to perform public opinion researches, another innovative activity in the French market. By the end of the '80s, it was the fifth largest media research company in France. The great activity of French policymakers at the time helped to strengthen the position of the company, especially the public opinion research sector.

European expansion
During the 1990s, Ipsos expanded, principally through acquisitions, to Spain, Italy, Germany, the United Kingdom and Central Europe, especially Hungary.

In 1992, the company was opened to private investment to improve its purchasing capital. The first new shareholder was Baring Private Equity. Truchot and Lech, the major shareholders, retained two-thirds of the company.

Global expansion
In the mid-'90s Ipsos was one of the most important research companies in Europe and decided to expand globally. Ipsos took on new investment partners, selling 40 percent of the company to Artemis Group, led by François Pinault, and the Amstar investment fund led by Walter Butler.

In 1997, Ipsos entered into the South American market with the acquisition of Novaction’s companies in Argentina, Brazil and Mexico. In 1998 it entered the North American market with the purchase of the American company ASI Market Research.

In 1999, Ipsos was listed on the Paris stock exchange. The successful offering enabled Artemis and Amstar to cash out on their investments and also gave Ipsos the possibility to continue its expansion. Then, it participated of the creation of an Internet audience research joint-venture, MMXI Europe, with the majority of shares held by partner Media Matrix and 20 percent by Ipsos. The company also took control of four subsidiaries of NFO Worldwide specializing in the formation of access panels. The expansion continued in Asia, South America and especially in North America (with the purchase of the Canadian company Angus Reid, renamed Ipsos-Reid in 2000).

In 2011, Ipsos acquired Aegis Group Plc's Synovate division.

On 30 October 2018 Ipsos announced that it acquired Synthesio, a Social Intelligence Suite that was named the leading global Social Listening platform by Forrester Research since 2014.

Ben Page became Chief Executive in November 2021, replacing Didier Truchot, the founder, who remained as Chairman.

In February 2023, it was announced Ipsos had acquired the New York-based business-to-business research company, Xperiti for an undisclosed amount.

Ipsos Australia
Ipsos Australia has existed since at least 2000, and  has offices in Melbourne, Sydney, Brisbane and Perth. It runs opinion polls on a number of issues, such as community support for changing the date of Australia Day, moving away from coal, Australia becoming a republic, the effects of the COVID-19 pandemic on young people's mental health, and, until 2019, political preferences.

The results of Ipsos polls in Australia are published in The Sydney Morning Herald (SMH), The Age and the Australian Financial Review (AFR). 
However, following a shock result of the 2019 Australian federal election, when the Coalition won the election against all of the opinion polls' predictions, the Nine Entertainment group, which owns the SMH, Age and AFR, decided to discontinue its relationship with Ipsos. Since then and  the newspapers have not reported any political polling, but continue to report the results of other Ipsos polls.

Financial performance

Ipsos revenues totaled €1,785.3 million in 2015, with an organic growth rate of −1%. In 2014, Ipsos derived 44% of its revenue from the EMEA region (Europe, the Middle East and Africa), 39% from the Americas region, and 17% from the Asia-Pacific region.

Top 10 of the Market Research Sector 2019

Source: ESOMAR Global Market Research Report 2019

Subsidiaries

 Ipsos MORI
 Ipsos Reid
 Ipsos Business Consulting
 Ipsos Alfacom
 Ipsos Apoyo
 Ipsos Archway
 Ipsos ASI
 Ipsos Bimsa
 Ipsos Connect
 Ipsos Healthcare
 Ipsos Insight
 Ipsos Interactive Services
 Ipsos Loyalty
 Ipsos Marketing
 Ipsos Markinor (Ipsos South Africa)
 Ipsos MRBI
 Ipsos Novaction
 Ipsos Observer
 Ipsos Public Affairs
 Ipsos RDA
 Ipsos UU
 Ipsos Vantis
 Livra.com
 Karian and Box

References

External links
 Official website

Consulting firms established in 1975
Market research companies of France
Public opinion research companies
Research and analysis firms of France
French companies established in 1975
Companies listed on Euronext Paris
Opinion polling in Australia